Ceyhun Yazar (born 16 May 1992) is a Turkish football defender who plays for Orhangazispor. He made his Süper Lig debut against Akhisar Belediyespor on 29 September 2012.

References

External links
 Ceyhun Yazar at TFF.org

1992 births
Living people
Sportspeople from Zonguldak
Turkish footballers
Kardemir Karabükspor footballers
Süper Lig players
Association football fullbacks
Association football defenders